The  was a type of oiler of Japan, serving during the 1930s and World War II. They do not have an official class name. Therefore, this article uses common class names. And, this type has some variants. This article handles them collectively.

Background

 The London Naval Treaty forced shrinkage of a budget to the Imperial Japanese Navy (IJN). And it meant cooling of the Japanese shipbuilding industry worlds. The Great Depression more accelerated it. The IJN wanted to update their Notoro-class oilers and Ondo-class oilers, because these oilers were not able to chase the aircraft carrier.
 In 1929, the IJN decided their combat ship (battleship, aircraft carrier, cruiser, destroyer, submarine and torpedo boat) fuel only to heavy crude oil. And, the IJN was paid a grant to newly build large/high-speed tankers.
 In 1931, two marine transportation companies built the tankers which the IJN wanted. One was the 9,900 tons/17.5 knot Teiyō Maru, the other the 9,500 tons/18.8 knots Fujisan Maru.
 The IJN was satisfied by Fujisan Maru. The IJN recommended building of the improved Fujisan Maru class tanker.

Construction
 In 1932, the  ordered two tankers Tōa Maru and Kyokutō Maru to the Kawasaki Shipbuilding Corporation. In total 17 tankers were built with the same basic drawings, until 1943.
 All sisters participated to World War II. However, they were not able to survive at all.

Ships in classes

Tōa Maru class
 First production model of the Kawasaki-type tankers. Their success gave courage to other steamship companies.

Tatekawa Maru class
 Second production model. They were built by the same as Tōa Maru class drawings. However, their details were different by steamship company which they placed an order for (example: Nippon Maru removed one dry cargo hold). Narrow sense of the Kawasaki-type tanker was until the Kyūei Maru. Kyūei Maru was equipped surplus stocks of the Argentina Maru machinery.

Nisshō Maru class
 One of the variant of the Kawasaki-type tankers. The Mitsubishi used many curves to reduce her air friction strength.

Kuroshio Maru class
 One of the variant of the Kawasaki-type tankers. Kuroshio Maru was equipped with a La-Mont boiler. Her design was used for the Type 1TL wartime standard ship.

Akatsuki Maru class
 One of the variant of the Kawasaki-type tankers. The Harima Zōsen used the Sulzer diesel.

Service

Characteristics

Photos

Footnotes

Bibliography
Tashirō Iwashige, The visual guide of Japanese wartime merchant marine,  (Japan), May 2009
Monthly Armor Modelling special issue, "Navy Yard Vol.8 Tora! Tora! Tora!", Dainippon Kaiga (Japan), July 2008
Kunio Matsumoto, The Lives of the Japanese Tankers,  (Japan), January 1995
Shinshichirō Komamiya, The Wartime Convoy Histories,  (Japan), October 1987
The Maru Special, Japanese Naval Vessels No.53, "Japanese support vessels",  (Japan), July 1981
60 Years of the Iino Lines,  (Japan), June 1959
50 year History of Harima Zōsen, Harima Zōsen Corporation, November 1960
Photo Gallery of the Japanese merchant ships, Shutei Kyokai Shuppanbu (Japan), August 1950
 

World War II naval ships of Japan
World War II tankers
Oilers
Auxiliary replenishment ship classes